Malianwa Station is a station on the Line 16 of the Beijing Subway. It opened in December 2016.

Schedule
As of December 2016:

Station Layout 
The station has an underground island platform.

Exits 
There are 2 exits, lettered A and C. Exit A is accessible.

Future development 
As a part of Line 13 split project, Line 13B will start from this station.

References 

Beijing Subway stations in Haidian District
Railway stations in China opened in 2016